William David Murdoch (10 February 18889 September 1942) was an Australian pianist, composer and author.

Early life and education
Murdoch was born at Sandhurst (now Bendigo, Victoria), the son of Andrew Murdoch, an engineer, and his wife Annie, née Esler. At 11 years of age William began piano lessons and soon won several solo competitions. In 1903 he was awarded the first Bendigo Austral Scholarship. This entitled him to three years' tuition at the University of Melbourne Conservatorium of Music, where he continued his studies under William Adolphus Laver, later Ormond Professor of Music. In 1906 Murdoch won the (Sir William John) Clarke Scholarship, which entitled him to three years' tuition at the Royal College of Music, London. As the scholarship was not large enough to fully provide for the young man, it was agreed that he should receive the balance of his Austral Scholarship, and a further amount was raised from a concert and subscriptions at Bendigo. Murdoch spent four happy years at the London College and made great progress, under the guidance of a Danish pianist and teacher, Frits Hartvigson.

Career
Murdoch's first public recital in London towards the end of 1910 was very successful, and in 1912 he toured Australia with Louise Kirkby Lunn. He remained there in 1913 and toured with Dame Clara Butt and Kennerley Rumford. He was now a fine player with a sparkling technique, especially successful in his interpretation of the work of Chopin and Debussy. He toured the US and Canada during 1914, and for some time was with the band of the Grenadier Guards in France during the war. On 5 August 1915 Murdoch married Ellen Josephine Tuckfield in London.

Murdoch gave recitals in Scandinavia in 1918 and in the following year began his long association with the violinist Albert Sammons, which developed into the formation of the "Chamber Music Players". These two with Lionel Tertis and Lauri Kennedy did some remarkable ensemble playing. In 1919 he participated in the premieres of Sir Edward Elgar's Violin Sonata in E minor and Piano Quintet in A minor.

Murdoch's first wife, Ellen Josephine Tuckfield, died; he subsequently married divorcee Dorothy Violet Lang, née Mascall, on 21 March 1921, and after she divorced him, married Antonia Dorothea Meek, née Simon, on 25 November 1925.

Murdoch contributed the article on "Pianoforte Music from 1880" to A Dictionary of Modern Music and Musicians, published in 1924, and in 1929 he again visited Australia and toured with Harold Williams. In 1933 Murdoch published a volume on Brahms, in which he analyzed all his work for the piano, and in 1934 appeared Chopin: His Life, an interesting record that made use of much new material. He had intended to include a comprehensive study of Chopin's works in a later volume, but this had not appeared when Murdoch died at Holmbury St Mary, Surrey, on 9 September 1942. Murdoch left a widow, two sons, and two daughters.

Style
Murdoch's arrangements of organ work by Bach for the piano were very effective, and he also composed a number of songs and pieces for the piano. He was steeped in music from his childhood. When he first appeared he had a brilliant technique to which the years added the warmth of temperament and sensitiveness of thought, needed for the expression of a fine musician. He was especially renowned as one of the great ensemble players of his time. The critic William James Turner wrote in 1916: Even when we get to the best pianists it is rarely, if ever, that we find a combination of exceptional technical mastery with tone-power, the delicacy of touch, brilliance, command of color, sensitiveness of phrasing, variety of feeling, imagination, and vital passion. Mr. Murdoch possesses all these qualities to a high degree (ADB).

References
J. A. Provan, 'Murdoch, William David (1888 - 1942)', Australian Dictionary of Biography, Volume 10, MUP, 1986, pp 632–633. Retrieved 2009-10-25

1888 births
1942 deaths
Australian classical pianists
Male classical pianists
Australian male composers
Australian composers
Australian non-fiction writers
Writers from Victoria (Australia)
Alumni of the Royal College of Music
People from Bendigo
20th-century classical pianists
20th-century Australian male musicians
20th-century Australian musicians